The Battle of Cape Spada was a naval battle during the Battle of the Mediterranean in Second World War. It took place on 19 July 1940 in the Mediterranean Sea off Cape Spada, the north-western extremity of Crete.

Prelude
The battle occurred when an Allied squadron patrolling the Aegean encountered two Italian cruisers transferring from Tripoli to Leros, at that time an Italian colony in the Dodecanese Islands.

Battle
The other destroyers led the Italian cruisers on a chase northwards to give Sydney time to come to the rescue. Sydney sighted the Italians at 08:26, opening fire at 08:29, and the Italian cruisers turned away to the southwest.

In the running battle which followed, Bartolomeo Colleoni was hit hard by Sydney and after a shell tore through her unarmored hull, the boilers and guns were disabled at 09:23, leaving her dead in the water. She fought on, but was unable to manoeuvre or use her main battery; despite the fire from her  guns, she was sunk by three torpedoes launched from Ilex and Hyperion at 09:59. Sydney continued to fire against Bande Nere. She was hit in the funnel by a single Italian shell, but managed to hit Bande Nere at least twice, killing eight in the bow and the hangar. Later, Sydney disengaged because she was short of ammunition and Giovanni delle Bande Nere returned to Benghazi, shadowed by the battleship HMS Warspite and a screen of destroyers. 555 survivors of Bartolomeo Colleoni were rescued; 121 died.

Despite their speed advantage, the Italian cruisers failed to outrun HMAS Sydney because they had to steer south-southwest, instead of the most obvious route of escape to the south, in order to avoid being trapped between the enemy and the shores of Crete. This gave the Australian cruiser the chance to close the range, as she did. The light armour of Colleoni  and  Bande Nere was unable to withstand Sydneys rounds. The lack of aerial reconnaissance was another factor contributing to the successful Allied chase.

Aftermath
The British destroyers were bombed by Italian aircraft in the aftermath, resulting in damage to HMS Havock, whose no. 2 boiler was flooded. A floatplane from Warspite, which was searching for Bande Nere, ditched in the sea and was lost near Tobruk. The crew was captured by the Italians. Allied convoy AN.2 was ordered to sail back to Port Said and remain there until it was eventually known that Bande Nere had reached Benghazi.

Order of battle

Italy

 Rear Admiral Ferdinando Casardi - 2nd Cruiser Division
 Regia Marina: 2 light cruisers:  (sunk),

Allies

 Captain John Collins - 2nd Destroyer Flotilla
 1 light cruiser: 

Notes

References
 
 Greene, Jack & Massignani, Alessandro (1998). The Naval War in the Mediterranean, 1940–1943. Chatam Publishing, London. 
 
 Titterton, G. A.(2002). The Royal Navy and the Mediterranean. Volume 2. Routledge.

External links
 Action off Cape Spada
 Scontro di Capo Spada 

Cape Spada
1940 in Italy
Cape Spada
Cape Spada
Cape Spada
Cape Spada
July 1940 events